Events from the year 1518 in art.

Events
 Titian begins painting The Worship of Venus (Madrid, Museo del Prado) during 1518-1519 and completes his large Assumption of the Virgin (1516-1518) for the altar of Santa Maria Gloriosa dei Frari in Venice, his first major commission in the city.
 Bernard van Orley probably makes four tapestry cartoons for the Legend of Our Lady on the Zavel during 1516-1518.

Paintings

Albrecht Altdorfer - Sebastian Altar in St. Florian's Priory, Sankt Florian, near Linz, Upper Austria
Albrecht Dürer - Maria Praying
Adriaen Isenbrandt
Bröhmse triptych with Adoration of the Magi (St. Mary's Church, Lübeck; destroyed 1942)
Portrait of Paulus de Nigro
Raphael (some dates approximate)
Ezekiel's Vision
Self-portrait with a friend
St. Michael Vanquishing Satan
The Holy Family of Francis I
Titian - Assumption of the Virgin

Births
September 29 – Tintoretto (real name Jacopo Comin), Italian painter of the Venetian school and probably the last great painter of the Italian Renaissance (died 1594) 
date unknown
Antonio Badile, Italian painter from Verona (died 1560)
Hieronymus Cock, Flemish painter, etcher and publisher of prints (died 1570)
Étienne Delaune, French engraver and goldsmith (died 1595)
Mayken Verhulst, Flemish miniature, tempera and watercolor painter (died 1599)
Marx Weiß, German Gothic painter (died 1580)

Deaths
January 5 (or 1517) – Francesco Raibolini known as Francesco Francia, Italian painter, goldsmith, and medallist (born 1450)
date unknown
Lorenzo Fasolo, Lombard painter (born 1463)
Francisco Henriques, Flemish Renaissance painter active in Portugal (b. unknown)
Guido Mazzoni, Italian sculptor and painter (born 1445)
Domenico Morone, Italian painter from Verona (born 1442)
Rodrigo de Osona - Spanish Renaissance painter (born 1440)
Bartolomeo Sanvito, calligrapher (born 1435)

References

 
Years of the 16th century in art